Neha Rathi is an Indian wrestler. She was born in Bhaproda village district Jhajjar, Haryana. She is the daughter of Arjuna award-winner Jagroop Singh Rathi. She participated in 10 senior National championships and represented India on the international circuit at various levels more than 35 times. She competed in the  weight category. Her achievements include:

 Bronze medal in Asian Championship 2008 (South Korea) 
 2013 Arjuna award

References

External links 
 Photo

Indian female sport wrestlers
Wrestlers at the 2006 Asian Games
Living people
Sportswomen from Haryana
21st-century Indian women
21st-century Indian people
Year of birth missing (living people)
Female sport wrestlers from Haryana
Asian Games competitors for India
Recipients of the Arjuna Award